Gino Felixdaal (born 5 January 1990) is a Dutch footballer who currently plays for amateur side SDZ.

Club career
He made his professional debut for Vitesse in a 14 April 2010 Eredivisie match against NAC. He joined Eerste Divisie side Almere City in 2011 but moved into amateur football two years later with Topklasse club FC Chabab. He later played for ADO '20 and JOS .

References

External links
 Voetbal International profile

1990 births
Living people
Footballers from Amsterdam
Association football central defenders
Dutch footballers
SBV Vitesse players
Almere City FC players
ADO '20 players
Eredivisie players
Eerste Divisie players